Mindhunter may refer to:

 Mindhunter: Inside the FBI's Elite Serial Crime Unit, non-fiction crime book written by retired FBI agent John E. Douglas and Mark Olshaker (1995)
 Mindhunter (TV series), American crime drama streaming television series created by Joe Penhall, based on the eponymous book (2017–20)
 Mindhunter (comic book), three-issue comic book miniseries published by Dark Horse Comics (2000–01)
Mindhunters, 2004 American-British crime thriller slasher film (2004)

See also
Minehunter, vessel for detecting and destroying naval mines